Delgado is a Spanish and Portuguese surname.

Delgado may also refer to:

 Delgado, San Salvador, a city of about 175,000 in El Salvador, located to the east of the capital, San Salvador
 Delgado (footballer) (born 1957), Portuguese footballer
 The Delgados, a Scottish indie rock band
 Delgado Community College, a community college in the New Orleans, Louisiana area

See also
 Cabo Delgado Province, a province of Mozambique
 Cape Delgado, a coastal headland on the border of Mozambique and Tanzania
 SM Delgado, a department store in Iloilo City, Philippines